Gliwice railway station is a junction railway station in the city centre of Gliwice in the Silesian Voivodeship. The railway station in Gliwice is the second largest railway station in the Upper Silesian urban area. The station opened on October 2, 1845, with the opening of a rail line from Wrocław. In 2015–2016,the station and its platforms were completely reconstructed. The station is connected to cities abroad via EuroCity services, various cities in Poland via PKP Express Intercity Premium (EIP), Intercity (IC), and Twoje Linie Kolejowe (TLK) services, and various regional cities via Polregio as well as Koleje Śląskie (Silesian Railways) services.

Train services
The station is served by the following service(s):

EuroCity services (EC) (EC 95 by DB) (IC by PKP) Berlin - Frankfurt (Oder) - Rzepin - Wrocław – Katowice – Kraków – Rzeszów – Przemyśl
EuroCity services (EC) (IC by PKP) Berlin - Frankfurt (Oder) - Rzepin - Wrocław – Katowice – Kraków – Rzeszów – Przemyśl
Express Intercity Premium services (EIP) Gdynia - Warsaw - Katowice - Gliwice
Intercity services (IC) Kraków Główny — Świnoujście
Intercity services (IC) Olsztyn - Warszawa - Skierniewice - Częstochowa - Katowice - Gliwice - Racibórz
Intercity services (TLK) Warszawa - Częstochowa - Katowice - Opole - Wrocław - Szklarska Poręba Górna
Regional services (R) Opole Główne - Gliwice 
Regional service (PR) Wrocław - Oława - Brzeg - Opole Główne - Gliwice
Regional services (KŚ)  Gliwice – Zabrze - Katowice – Zawiercie - Częstochowa
Regional services (KŚ)  Gliwice – Bytom
Regional services (KŚ)  Gliwice – Knurów – Rybnik – Żory– Chybie – Skoczów – Ustron – Wisła

See also
Rail transport in Poland

References 

Railway stations in Poland opened in 1845
Railway stations in Silesian Voivodeship
Buildings and structures in Gliwice
Railway stations served by Przewozy Regionalne InterRegio